The Battle of Afabet was fought from 17 March through 20 March 1988 in and around the town of Afabet, as part of the Eritrean War of Independence.

Background 
The Nadew Command was one of four commands, or army corps, of the Ethiopian Second Revolutionary Army. Led by Colonel Getaneh Haile, it was composed of three infantry divisions and accompanying support units, and some sources state it had between 20,000 and 22,000 soldiers. Gebru Tareke, noted that the morale of the soldiers was at an all-time low, and none of the divisions "had even half of the numbers that would normally constitute an Ethiopian division – ten to twelve thousand men", quotes Ministry of Defense reports to state that there were 15,223 men in the three divisions. 

The Eritrean People's Liberation Front (EPLF) had attacked the Nadew Command a few months previously, with limited success. On 8 December 1987, the EPLF attacked one of the divisions of the Command, the 22nd mountain division, with a force that may have contained as many as five infantry brigades, one mechanized battalion, and three heavy-weapon battalions. On the second day of the assault, Eritrean infiltrators destroyed the divisional control center. It required the assistance of the Nineteenth Mountain Infantry Division and the 45th Infantry Brigade to halt further advances and repel the EPLF forces. Ethiopian losses in this preliminary engagement were 242 killed, 291 wounded, and 615 missings; Eritrean losses have been estimated at 125 killed and 269 wounded. However, the Ethiopian side suffered even graver losses in the aftermath: on Mengistu Haile Mariam's order twenty senior officers were transferred and the commander of the Nadew Command, General Tariku Ayne, who had been absent from Afabet for medical treatment, was executed outside of Asmara on 15 February 1988. The death of one of Ethiopia's most prominent generals surprised even the EPLF, whose Radio of the Masses broadcast that the Derg had "cut off its right hand with its left hand". The Twenty-second Division was moved to Keren, and replaced with the Fourteenth Infantry Division.

By this time, Nadew Command had three divisions over-stretching to cover the wide area of operation which had been covered by five divisions prior. The Command could not adequately provide force to strategically operate at a distance from its main body for the purpose of resistance against enemy attack. Thus, Command's ability to provide early and accurate warning on enemy movement and appropriate response was degraded. Subsequently, the main force lacked the benefit of enough reaction time and maneuver space to effectively respond to enemy attack. 

By mid-March 1988 the Nadew Command had planned to launch an offensive campaign against the Eritrean People's Liberation Front (EPLF); however, they were pre-empted by the EPLF.

Battle 
On the morning of 17 March 1988, the EPLF deployed troops on three sides around Hedai Valley to encircle the Ethiopian garrison. The first unit attacked was the newly arrived Fourteenth Division. Upon their attack, the Ethiopian forces began to withdraw but were cut off. The battle continued while the Ethiopian garrison from Keren tried to reinforce their position, which was thwarted by the EPLF.

A stumbling block for the EPLF was on the left flank, where their Eighty-fifth Division was held up by the dogged resistance of the Ethiopian Twenty-ninth Mechanized Brigade. It fought without reinforcement for most of a day until its commander gambled on a retreat to Afabet. Lacking time for careful reconnaissance before its withdrawal, the brigade was halted when a tank and truck were disabled by Eritrean 100mm guns, the burning vehicles blocking the road. The Ethiopians were forced to destroy their weaponry to prevent them from falling into EPLF hands. Ethiopian aircraft even bombed their own troops. The commander of the Second Revolutionary Army came to the battlefield himself to supervise opening the road to Afabet "until he allegedly 'escaped on a camel' just before the fall of the garrison." Once the Ethiopian troops were routed in Hedai Valley, the EPLF stormed and captured Afabet. As the town was a major garrison the EPLF also captured a large cache of weapons in addition to those captured in the valley.

Killion estimates that by the end of the three-day battle, the EPLF had killed over 8,000 Ethiopian soldiers. After losing Afabet, on the following days the Ethiopian troops abandoned the towns of Tesseneiei, Barentu and Agordat, since they thought they could not defend them any longer, and concentrated most of their forces on Keren.

Aftermath 
Not long after this defeat, Berhane Woldemichael wrote in the periodical Review of African Political Economy,
 The significance to the Ethiopian regime of the loss of Afabet cannot be overstated. In this single battle, Ethiopia lost whole divisions of its best-trained and armed troops. Worse still, it left behind a weapons stockpile that it had amassed to carry out what it believed was to have been 'a decisive offensive' against the EPLF. That 'decisive offensive' was being planned by Soviet military advisors. As it was, the EPLF, clearly outsmarting the Soviets, turned around the 'planned offensive' to their advantage. The Soviet Union had always denied direct involvement in Eritrea but was caught red-handed by the EPLF at Afabet by the capture of three Soviet military personnel, another one was killed in the combat.

The victory over the Nadew Command is considered by the historian Basil Davidson to be the most significant victory for any liberation movement since the Vietnamese victory at Dien Bien Phu. It has also been described as the largest battle in Africa since El Alamein. However, the Ethiopian historian Gebru Tareke disagrees with this comparison to Dien Bien Phu, pointing out that Davidson made his observation from the field as a guest of the EPLF, and that "the Ethiopian armed forces continued to fight, at times quite vigorously, for another three years." He concludes, "From a global perspective, Afabet was an event whereas Dien Bien Phu was eventful."

References

Sources
 

Battles of the Ethiopian Civil War
1988 in Eritrea
1988 in Ethiopia
Battles involving Ethiopia
Battles involving Cuba
Conflicts in 1988
Eritrean War of Independence
March 1988 events in Africa
Ethiopia–Soviet Union relations